Blood meal is a dry, inert powder made from blood, used as a high-nitrogen organic fertilizer and a high protein animal feed. N = 13.25%, P = 1.0%, K = 0.6%. It is one of the highest non-synthetic sources of nitrogen. It usually comes from cattle or hogs as a slaughterhouse by-product.

Uses

Dietary supplement 
Blood meal can be used as a livestock dietary supplement and is mainly added to supply dietary lysine for cattle, fish and poultry. Prior to use, it is sometimes mixed with molasses.

Organic fertilizers 
Blood meal, bone meal, and other animal by-products are permitted in certified organic production as soil amendments, though they cannot be fed to organic livestock. Blood meal is different from bone meal in that blood meal contains a higher amount of nitrogen, while bone meal contains phosphorus. Alternatives to Blood Meal include feather meal and alfalfa meal. Blood meal is sometimes used as a composting activator.

Pest control 
Blood meal can be spread on gardens to deter pest animals such as rabbits. The theory is that the animals smell the blood and are repelled by the odor.

Classifications
It is a proteinaceous concentrate according to classifications of feed.
It is a protein-yielding feedstuff according to classifications of feedstuffs.

Processing 
Blood needs to be dried before being used as blood meal. Several drying methods are available: solar drying, oven drying, drum drying, flash drying or spray drying.

See also
 Blood as food
 Bone ash
 Bone meal
 
 Taboo food

References 

Soil improvers
Organic fertilizers
Animal products